The Auckland Business Chamber (known as the Auckland Chamber of Commerce until 2018), is a New Zealand business network representing the interests of businesses in the Auckland region. It is a non-governmental organisation.

History
The Chamber was founded in 1856, at a meeting of merchants on 24 January, during a period of economic depression. Active in the 1860s, the Chamber floundered somewhat before an 1869 reorganisation that opened its ranks to a wider variety of merchants, on an annual subscription basis.

Following its inception it focused on issues ranging from remedying trade abuses and obtaining adequate facilities for businesses, to standardization of grain weights and simplifying the customs tariff.

Michael Barnett was the chief executive and spokesperson for the Chamber from 1991 until 2022.

Activities and services
The Chamber provides support to businesses, hosts events and training courses, and publishes business-related information. It advocates to government on behalf of its members.

References

External links
Official website
Summary of related articles on New Zealand Herald website
Summary of related articles on National Business Review website

Chambers of commerce
1856 establishments in New Zealand
Business organisations based in New Zealand
Organisations based in Auckland
Economy of Auckland